Stephen Coote (born 19 September 1970) is an English professional darts player. He won the German Open in 1999. He is not a full-time professional and works as a fireman.

BDO career
Coote made his televised debut at the 1999 Winmau World Masters, beating Matt Chapman in the first round, before losing in the second round to Dave King. He then played at the 2000 BDO World Darts Championship, beating Martin Adams in the first round, but lost to Co Stompé. In the 2001 BDO World Darts Championship he lost in the first round to Wayne Mardle. In the 2002 World Championship, he beat Sweden's Markus Korhonen in round one, but lost to Martin Adams in the second round. He reached the 2002 Dutch Open final, but lost to Shaun Greatbatch, who hit the first nine-darter on live television. He followed that with a semi-final place at the 2002 World Masters, with wins over Darryl Fitton, Alan Reynolds, Ted Hankey and Mike Veitch. His run ended though with a defeat to Tony West.  In 2003, he was beaten in the first round at Lakeside by Mervyn King. The 2004 World Championship saw him play in a thriller with Gary Robson. Coote was 2–0 up in sets, but Robson fought back to level it at 2–2 and eventually took the match in a sudden death leg.

PDC Switch
Shortly afterwards, Coote switched to the rival Professional Darts Corporation. His first tournament in the PDC was the Las Vegas Desert Classic Qualifiers and he qualified for the event. He reached the quarter-finals, losing to the eventual winner Phil Taylor. Despite his PDC career getting off to a great start, he never made much progress afterwards, with only a quarter-final place in the Bob Anderson Classic in 2005 to show for. He played at the 2006 UK Open, reaching the last 64 stage. He then reached the last 32 of the Bobby Bourn Memorial, receiving £150 for his efforts. It would be his final winnings in the PDC Pro Tour as he suffered early exit in qualifiers for the World Grand Prix and World Championship as well as the UK Open Regionals, earning no money as a result. During 2013 Coote has won a tour card while playing in the PDC Qualifying School, so he can now play on the PDC Circuit.

Return to BDO
In September 2007, Coote became a rarity in world darts, becoming one of only a few players to return to the BDO after switching to the PDC. However his second spell began just like his final PDC days, suffering early exits from the World Masters and the Lakeside World Championship qualifiers. He then found some form, reaching the last 16 of the Scottish Open in February 2008 losing to Garry Thompson who caused a major shock by winning the event. Coote quit the BDO in 2017.

World Championship results

BDO
2000: 2nd Round (lost to Co Stompé 1–3) (sets)
2001: 1st Round (lost to Wayne Mardle 2–3)
2002: 2nd Round (lost to Martin Adams 1–3)
2003: 1st Round (lost to Mervyn King 1–3)
2004: 1st Round (lost to Gary Robson 2–3)

References

External links
Steve Coote's website
Steve Coote's profile and stats on Darts Database

1970 births
English darts players
Living people
Sportspeople from Bolton
British Darts Organisation players
Professional Darts Corporation former tour card holders